Mukim Brothers is a Bangladeshi comedy drama series, started at 23 June 2010 which is aired on Channel i. It is directed by Ashfaque Nipun and it stars Zahidul Haque Apu, Nusrat Imrose Tisha, Musafire Syed Bachchu, Ishrat Jahan Chaity, Elita Karim in the lead roles.

The show was publicly acclaimed well. The show ended on its 52nd episode.

Cast 
 Musafire Syed Bachchu as Anwar Mukim
 Zahidul Haque Apu as Badrul Mukim
 Nusrat Imrose Tisha as Badrul Mukim's wife and Anwar Mukim's friend
 Ishrat Jahan Chaity as Chaity
 Elita Karim as Dooty
 Rasheda Chowdhury as Disco Amma

References

2010 Bangladeshi television series debuts
2010s Bangladeshi television series
Television series created by Ashfaque Nipun
Channel i original programming